Albert Mächler (born 20 March 1950) is a Swiss biathlete. He competed in the 20 km individual event at the 1976 Winter Olympics.

References

1950 births
Living people
Swiss male biathletes
Olympic biathletes of Switzerland
Biathletes at the 1976 Winter Olympics
Place of birth missing (living people)